Beverly Hills Cop: Original Motion Picture Soundtrack is the soundtrack to the 1984 action comedy film Beverly Hills Cop. It was released in December 1984 by MCA Records. The soundtrack was mastered by Greg Fulginiti and features various artists whose tracks were included in the movie plus some other tracks not included in the movie but are similar in electronic style. The instrumental title tune, "Axel F" by Harold Faltermeyer, became a worldwide hit single and has since been covered by numerous artists.

The soundtrack was reviewed by Billboard magazine in the issue dated December 15, 1984 and debuted on the US Billboard 200 the week ending January 12, 1985 at No. 177. It hit #1 on the US Billboard 200 album chart on June 22, 1985.

The soundtrack won a Grammy Award for Best Score Soundtrack for Visual Media in 1986. The Grammy was awarded jointly to Marc Benno, Harold Faltermeyer, Keith Forsey, Micki Free, John Gilutin, David "Hawk" Wolinski, Howard Hewett, Bunny Hull, Howie Rice, Sharon Robinson, Danny Sembello, Sue Sheridan, Richard Theisen and Allee Willis.

A key song in the movie, "Nasty Girl" by Vanity 6, played during the strip club robbery scene, is not included in the soundtrack.

Track listing

There was another version of this soundtrack that contains "BHC (I Can't Stop)" by Rick James in place of "Emergency" by Rockie Robbins.

Official score album
In 2016, La-La Land Records issued a limited edition album featuring the complete film score composed by Harold Faltermeyer as well as several of the songs used. The label originally planned to release it as part of a 2-disc set with the expanded Beverly Hills Cop II soundtrack, but La-La Land Records was contractually obligated to issue each album separately. In 2019, La-La Land Records released a 35th Anniversary Limited Edition album with the same tracks.

 "Foley Finds Mikey" – 1:20
 "Bad Guys" – 1:23
 "Flowers" – 0:23
 "Foley Busted" – 1:29
 "Cops Follow Merc" – 0:43
 "Late Dinner/Warehouse" – 2:48
 "Shoot Out" – 1:44
 "Customs" – 1:31
 "The New Team" – 0:40
 "Chase to Harrow’s" – 2:42
 "Rosewood/Foley to Gallery" – 0:57
 "The Discovery" – 2:15)
 "Rosewood Saves Foley/Rosewood/Foley to Mansion" – 3:10
 "Good Guys on Grounds" – 3:14
 "Foley Shoots a Bad Guy" – 1:22
 "Zack Shoots" – 1:06
 "Zack Shot" – 0:54
 "Maitland Shot" – 0:51
 "Shoot Out" (alternate ending) – 1:42
 "The Discovery" (alternate) – 2:18
 "The Discovery" (theme suite) – 2:51
 "Zack Shot" (alternate) – 0:54
 "Axel F" (album version) – 3:00
 "Shoot Out" (album version) – 2:44
 "The Heat Is On" by Glenn Frey – 3:45
 "Neutron Dance" by The Pointer Sisters – 4:12
 "New Attitude" by Patti LaBelle – 4:36
 "Do You Really (Want My Love?)" by Junior Giscombe – 3:41
 "Stir It Up" by Patti LaBelle – 3:36

Charts

Certifications

References 

1984 soundtrack albums
MCA Records soundtracks
Soundtrack
Action film soundtracks
Comedy film soundtracks